The Jammu and Kashmir Board of School Education (abbreviated as  JK BOSE) is the main board of school education in the Union Territories of Jammu and Kashmir and Ladakh. It is based in Jammu & Srinagar and is an autonomous body under the administration of the  Government of Jammu and Kashmir. The board gives affiliation to more than 10200 schools across the state and employs 22856 teachers. The Jammu and Kashmir Board of School Education was established through a legislation under the Jammu and Kashmir State Board of School Education Act, 1975 with Agha Ashraf Ali as its first chairman.

Purposes
According to its official website, the purposes of the board are to: 
 Secure that education should relate intimately to the development of potentialities of the youth, to the national needs and to the aspirations of the people
 Discover talent and nurture it; 
 Promote equality of opportunity by providing necessary facilities;
 Help generally to raise the standard of living and productivity of the State and achieve closer and willing participation of the people in a democratic process ;
 Regulate, control and develop education in the State of Jammu and Kashmir up to the Higher Secondary level by providing varied courses with a view to equipping pupils for different occupations, for education in the universities and other cultural purposes and to examine candidates and to award certificates to successful candidates and doing all other things incidental thereto.

Composition

The Board consists of:

The chair of the Board
The Commissioner/ Secretary to Government School Education Department 
The Director of School Education, Jammu 
The Director of School Education, Kashmir 
A representative from each of the two Universities of Kashmir and Jammu. Each representative is appointed by Council of the University involved. 
Four school teachers, two men and two women. They are appointed by the Government. The male teachers are concerned in the education of boys, and the female teachers in that of girls.
A well-known expert in education who is not part of the administration, but who is appointed by the Government 
 A representative of the Teachers' Training Institutions. This representative is appointed by the Government.
One man from among the Principals and Headmasters of teaching institutions in the State, appointed by the Government. 
One woman from among the Principals and Headmistress of teaching institutions in the State, appointed by the Government.

Major functions
The board is empowered to specify the courses of instruction and create syllabi for them, and to select textbooks for the elementary, and secondary schools and for the higher secondary (school gradation) school examinations; to conduct public examinations and publish the results at the secondary school and higher secondary levels; to grant diplomas or certificates to people who have passed its examinations; to recognize educational institutions at the secondary school and higher secondary levels, and conduct inspections of recognized institutions, ensuring that required facilitates, equipment, and staff are in place, that only the approved books and courses are taught, and that the standards are in accord with the relevant regulations; to remove recognition from schools that do not meet the proper conditions; to supervise and control the recognized institutions; and exercise various other powers given to it by law.

Exams conducted
The exams conducted by the Board are:

 Elementary Teacher's Training Institute, Jammu 
 Elementary Teacher's Training Institute, Kashmir 
 Higher Secondary - Pt II Annual (Pvt) - Jammu Prov.
 Higher Secondary Pt II Annual (Reg.) Jammu Prov.
 Higher Secondary Pt II Annual (Pvt.) Kashmir Prov.
 Higher Secondary Part Two - Kashmir - Annual 
 Higher Secondary - Part II Bi-Annual (Pvt)
 Jammu - Annual Private Class X Summer Zone & Winter Zone
 Jammu - Annual Regular Class X
 Leh - Annual Private & Regular Class X 
 Leh - Higher Secondary - Part II Annual & Bi-Annual (Reg. & Pvt)
 Leh - Matric Bi-annual - Srinagar
 Kargil - Annual Regular & Private Class X 
 Kargil -Higher Secondary - Part II Annual & Bi-Annual (Reg. & Pvt)
 Matric Bi-Annual - Srinagar
 Srinagar - Annual Private Class X

References

External links
Official Website
Old Website

Education in Jammu and Kashmir
State secondary education boards of India
State agencies of Jammu and Kashmir
Government agencies established in 1975
1975 establishments in Jammu and Kashmir